Probable G-protein coupled receptor 78 is a protein that in humans is encoded by the GPR78 gene.

G protein-coupled receptors (GPCRs, or GPRs) contain 7 transmembrane domains and transduce extracellular signals through heterotrimeric G proteins.[supplied by OMIM]

References

Further reading

G protein-coupled receptors